Mischa van der Heiden (born 1 September 1971, Rotterdam), commonly known by his stage name DJ Misjah, is a Dutch DJ.

In 1995, he produced "Access" which would be featured along with the Warp Brothers, MDM, and several others on the album, Radikal Techno 6. The track reached #16 in the UK Singles Chart in March 1996, and reappeared in a remix version in May 2000, when it peaked at #45.

He also made remixes for Josh Wink, Jam & Spoon, Reflect, Format One, Finitribe, Next Door But One, George le Nagelaux and Denki Groove.

References

External links
 Official Website
 DJ Misjah at Discogs

1971 births
Living people
Dutch DJs
Musicians from Rotterdam
Place of birth missing (living people)